Ancylosis semidiscella is a species of snout moth in the genus Ancylosis. It was described by Ragonot, in 1888. It is found in Argentina.

References

Moths described in 1888
semidiscella
Moths of South America